The 2010 Women's Professional Soccer season was the second season for the WPS, the top level professional women's soccer league in the United States. Regular season champion FC Gold Pride won the WPS Championship on September 26 with a 4-0 victory over the Philadelphia Independence.

Changes from the 2009 season
Two franchises, based in Philadelphia, and Atlanta, joined the league.
 A potential Dallas franchise is pending upon finding a site at which to play, and WPS is constantly considering other expansion possibilities as well, such as Seattle.
The Los Angeles Sol did not return, as that franchise was terminated January 28, 2010 after Anschutz Entertainment Group returned their franchise rights and a buyer was not found.
The number of games in the regular season increased from 20 to 24.
On May 27, financial problems caused the Saint Louis Athletica to fold.  Players became free agents on June 1.

Competition format and schedule
The regular season began on April 10 and ended on September 12 with a bye week on May 22 (the date the USWNT hosted Germany's WNT in a friendly); the playoffs began on September 19 and ended on September 26.
Each team played a total of 24 games, evenly divided between home and away games.  Under the following format, each team played three other teams four times each, two at home and two away, and the remaining four teams three times each, two at home and one away or one at home and two away.
The playoff format was identical to that of the 2009 season. The four teams with the most points from the regular season qualified for the playoffs. The third- and fourth-placed regular season finishers played each other in the single-match First Round, with the winner traveling to face the second-placed regular season finisher in the Super Semifinal midweek. The Super Semifinal winner then traveled to face the first-placed regular season finisher in the WPS Championship.
Games played against the Saint Louis Athletica before they folded still counted toward a team's point total.

2010 schedule

Standings

Attendance

Average home attendances
Ranked from highest to lowest average attendance.

Playoffs

WPS Championship

Leaders

Scoring

Fouls

Goalkeeping

Minimum 60 minutes played per game average

Awards

Player of the Week

Player of the Month

End-of-year awards
WPS announced its end-of-year awards on September 16.

Statistics

Scoring
First Goal of the Season: Lauren Cheney for Boston Breakers against Washington Freedom, 7th minute (April 10)
Earliest Goal in a Match: 2nd minute
Lori Lindsey for Philadelphia Independence against Sky Blue FC (June 6)
Latest Goal in a Match: 90th minute
Christie Welsh for Washington Freedom against Atlanta Beat (April 18)
Widest Winning Margin: 5 Goals
Atlanta Beat 1-6 FC Gold Pride (August 28)
Most Goals Scored in a Match: 7 Goals
Atlanta Beat 1-6 FC Gold Pride (August 28)
First Hat-Trick:
Fastest Hat-Trick:
First Own Goal: Allison Falk of Philadelphia Independence for Saint Louis Athletica (8 May)
Average Goals per Match: 2.45

Discipline
First Yellow Card: Fabiana for Boston Breakers against Washington Freedom, 44th minute (April 10)
First Red Card: Jen Buczkowski for Philadelphia Independence against Boston Breakers, 86th minute (April 18)
Most Yellow Cards in a Match: 3
Boston Breakers 1-1 Philadelphia Independence - 3 for Philadelphia (Caroline Seger, 2x Jen Buczkowski) (April 18)
Most Red Cards in a Match:

Related competitions

All-Star Game

WPS All-Star 2010 took place on June 30, a midseason date as opposed to the previous year's postseason All-Star game.  It was played at the new Kennesaw State University Soccer Stadium in Kennesaw, Georgia, home to the Atlanta Beat;.  The United States Coast Guard once again presented the game, which aired on Fox Soccer Channel again as well.

The all-star selection process was the same as in the previous year, although twice as many players were selected.  The top US vote-getter, Abby Wambach, and the top international vote-getter, Marta, then chose between the remaining 20 voted-on players to create their teams, with the 14 at-large selections being distributed by the league.  Marta's XI defeated Abby's XI 5–2.

References

External links
 Official Site

 
2010

1